German submarine U-236 was a Type VIIC U-boat of Nazi Germany's Kriegsmarine during World War II.

The submarine was laid down on 23 March 1942 at the Friedrich Krupp Germaniawerft yard at Kiel as yard number 666, launched on 24 November and commissioned on 9 January 1943 under the command of Oberleutnant zur See Reimar Ziesmer.

After training with the 5th U-boat Flotilla at Kiel, she spent the rest of the war as a 'school' boat. U-236 was transferred to the 24th flotilla on 29 September 1943, the 21st flotilla on 1 May 1944 and the 31st flotilla on 1 March 1945. She was scuttled near Schleimünde on 5 May 1945.

Design
German Type VIIC submarines were preceded by the shorter Type VIIB submarines. U-236 had a displacement of  when at the surface and  while submerged. She had two shafts and two  propellers.

U-236 was fitted with five  torpedo tubes (four fitted at the bow and one at the stern), fourteen torpedoes, one  SK C/35 naval gun, 220 rounds, and an anti-aircraft gun. The boat had a complement of between forty-four and sixty.

References

Bibliography

External links

German Type VIIC submarines
World War II submarines of Germany
U-boats commissioned in 1943
1942 ships
Ships built in Kiel
U-boats sunk in 1943
Maritime incidents in May 1943
Operation Regenbogen (U-boat)
Maritime incidents in May 1945